The Kunstmuseum Den Haag is an art museum in The Hague in the Netherlands, founded in 1866 as the Museum voor Moderne Kunst. Later, until 1998, it was known as Haags Gemeentemuseum, and until the end of September 2019 as Gemeentemuseum Den Haag. It has a collection of around 165,000 works, over many different forms of art. In particular, the Kunstmuseum is renowned for its large Mondrian collection, the largest in the world. Mondrian's last work, Victory Boogie-Woogie, is on display at the museum.

The current museum building was constructed between 1931–1935, designed by the Dutch architect H.P. Berlage. 

The KM21 (museum for contemporary art) and Fotomuseum Den Haag (The Hague museum for photography) are part of the Kunstmuseum, though not housed in the same building and with a separate entrance fee.

Collection

Modern art
The museum's collection of modern art includes works by international artists (Edgar Degas, Claude Monet, Pablo Picasso, Egon Schiele, Frank Stella, Lee Bontecou, Henri Le Fauconnier and many others) and Dutch artists (Constant, Vincent van Gogh, Johan Jongkind, Pyke Koch, Piet Mondriaan, Charley Toorop, Jan Toorop, and many others)..

Pottery and Glass art
The Kunstmuseum has one of the largest collections of Dutch Delftware in the world. Selected pieces of the collection are on display at the a permanent gallery which represent Dutch art in the 'Golden Age'. The museum also holds one of the largest collections of Persian ceramics and glasses in Europe.

Print Room
The museum has a collection of 19th- and 20th-century prints, posters and drawings, containing around 50,000 items. It comprises works by Dutch artists such as Co Westerik and Jan Toorop, as well as works by Rodolphe Bresdin, Ingres, Paul Klee, Toulouse-Lautrec, Odilon Redon and others. A selection is on view in the print room.

Fashion
The collection of fashion items, accessories, jewellery, drawings and prints includes historical items as well as modern ones by designers such as Cristóbal Balenciaga, Gabrielle Chanel, André Courrèges, John Galliano and Fong Leng. For reasons of conservation items are only shown at temporary exhibitions.

Music
The music collection includes a large collection of musical instruments and a music library, with an emphasis on European music. The collection mainly includes fortepianos, wind and plucked string instruments. Also, there are instruments from other cultures and contemporary electronic instruments. In addition, the collection includes prints, posters, drawings and photographs relating to 'performance practice'. Part of the collection came from the Scheurleer Music History Museum, that lasted from 1905 to 1935, and was purchased after the bankruptcy of Scheurleer & Zoonen in 1932.

Exhibitions
The museum has around 25 to 30 exhibitions per year. In 2021 and 2022 exhibitions have included Portuguese painter Paula Rego, Basque fashion designer Cristóbal Balenciaga and English potter and artist Grayson Perry.  The 2021 exhibition Monet: The Garden Paintings was voted as the best museum exhibition in the Netherlands.

Images from the museum

References

External links
 
Kunstmuseum Den Haag within Google Arts & Culture

Art museums and galleries in the Netherlands
Museums in The Hague
Modern art museums
Musical instrument museums
Art museums established in 1935
1935 establishments in the Netherlands
Brick buildings and structures
Brick Expressionism
International Style (architecture)
Modernist architecture in the Netherlands
Music organisations based in the Netherlands